Muurasjärvi is a medium-sized lake of Central Finland. It belongs to the Kymijoki main catchment area. It is located in the region Keski-Suomi in Pihtipudas municipality.

See also
List of lakes in Finland

References
  (English version may be available.)

Landforms of Central Finland
Lakes of Pihtipudas